CSS Savannah was a Richmond-class casemate ironclad in the Confederate States Navy during the American Civil War.

Savannah was built by H. F. Willink for the Confederacy at Savannah, Georgia, in 1863. On June 30, 1863 she was transferred to naval forces in the Savannah River under the command of Flag Officer William W. Hunter. Under Commander Robert F. Pinkney, she maintained her reputation as the most efficient vessel of the squadron and was kept ready for service. She remained on the river and was burned by the Confederates on December 21, 1864 when the city of Savannah was threatened by the approach of General William T. Sherman.

Bibliography

External links
 Navy.mil images

Ironclad warships of the Confederate States Navy
Ships built in Savannah, Georgia
1863 ships
Shipwrecks of the American Civil War
Shipwrecks in rivers
Maritime incidents in December 1864
Scuttled vessels
Ship fires